Chlorine is a 2013 American comedy-drama film directed and written by Jay Alaimo. Filming mainly took place in Madison, New Jersey and Wayne, New Jersey.

Plot
Roger Lent has worked at the same bank for more than twenty years. He is passed over for a promotion and his wife is not happy because she wants the good life. The family can barely afford a membership at Copper Canyon Country Club, and everyone else has these nice mansions. Roger's boss tells him he has to make more money for the bank in order to get a promotion. One way is to encourage people to invest in Copper Canyon Estates, where Roger's son Henry is being told to cut corners. Roger's daughter Cynthia is having to deal with her first period and becoming a teenager. After getting tennis pro/drug dealer Pat to invest his money, Roger finds out Copper Canyon Estates is a Ponzi scheme and he must decide whether to do the right thing.

Cast
 Kyra Sedgwick as Georgie
 Vincent D'Onofrio as Roger
 Flora Cross as Cynthia
 Ryan Donowho as Henry
 Rhys Coiro as Pat
 Tom Sizemore as Ernie
 Jordan Belfi as Doug
 Elisabeth Röhm as Catherine
 Michele Hicks as Elise
 Dreama Walker as Suzi
 Brian Petsos as Anderson
 Matt Ball as Josh
 Eddie Guerra as Ted
 Tristine Skyler as Trudy
 Britt Napier as "Binky"
 Todd Detwiler as Jeff
 Michael Janik as Junior
 Jackie Moore as Bookstore Owner
 Nik Belcevich as Michael
 Logan Hunter as Gus

Release 
Chlorine premiered at the Sun Valley Film Festival in Idaho on March 17, 2013.

Critical Reception 
On review aggregator Rotten Tomatoes, Chlorine has an approval rating of 8% based on 13 reviews.

References

External links
 
 
 

2013 comedy-drama films
2013 independent films
2013 films
American comedy-drama films
American independent films
Films about dysfunctional families
Films directed by Jay Alaimo
Films set in New England
Films shot in New Jersey
Midlife crisis films
2010s English-language films
2010s American films